WGNU  (920 AM) is a commercial radio station licensed to St. Louis, Missouri, and serving the Greater St. Louis media market.  The station is owned by Radio Property Ventures and broadcasts a sports gambling radio format, with programming from VSiN Radio.

WGNU's studios and offices are located on Hampton Avenue in St. Louis, Missouri, while its transmitter is located near the Interstate 255/Illinois Route 255/Interstate 270 interchange, off Chain of Rocks Road in Edwardsville, Illinois.

History
On December 1, 1961, WGNU first signed on the air from Granite City, Illinois.  Founded by Chuck Norman and owned by him for the rest of his life, it was held in trust after his 2004 death. Under Norman's ownership, the station featured a wide-ranging local talk format. Norman also signed on FM sister station WGNU-FM (now WARH) on November 24, 1965.

WGNU was sold to Radio Property Ventures, owners of KXEN, on September 26, 2007, and switched to a gospel music format. Initially, WGNU was a Top 40 station, then changed to country music and eventually talk, primarily aimed at the African-American community.

Former KFNS host Tim McKernan and his company, InsideSTL Enterprises, bought the weekday air time on WGNU, and the station switched its weekday programming to sports talk on August 1, 2013.  The weekday schedule consisted of 11 hours of local shows, as well as programming from CBS Sports Radio. The Urban Talk format continued to air on weekends. This lease agreement ended in September 2016, when insideSTL Enterprises took over the operations of KFNS and moved its programming onto that station.

The station briefly made national headlines when former St. Louis Cardinals player Jack Clark, who cohosted "The King and the Ripper" with longtime St. Louis radio personality Kevin "the King" Slaten, claimed Los Angeles Angels slugger Albert Pujols had performance-enhancing drugs (PEDs) while Pujols was with the Cardinals.  Clark had been the Cardinals' hitting coach during the early part of Pujols' 12-year tenure in St. Louis. Clark had said that he talked to Pujols' former personal trainer and said that "I know for a fact he was" using PEDs. Pujols responded by threatening Clark and WGNU with a defamation lawsuit, and vehemently denied that he had ever used PEDs.  The trainer added that he hadn't even talked to Clark in over ten years.  InsideSTL cut ties with Clark and Slaten after only seven shows.  It also issued an apology to Pujols.

In 2018, the station's community of license was changed from Granite City to Saint Louis, Missouri.

On October 12, 2021, WGNU changed their format from brokered programming to sports gambling, branded as "The Game", with programming from the VSIN Sports Betting Network.

Previous logo

References

External links

GNU
Madison County, Illinois
Radio stations established in 1961
1961 establishments in Illinois
Sports radio stations in the United States